Nuru Sulley (born 11 June 1992) is a Ghanaian professional footballer who plays for Duhok SC in the Iraqi Premier League as a centre-back or defensive midfielder.

Career
Nuru Sulley has played for Great Olympics where Sulley scored 3 goals, then Tudu Mighty Jets where Sulley had scored 2 goals and is currently playing with Accra Hearts of Oak SC as a centre back and defensive midfielder where Sulley has scored 2 goals in his first season with Accra Hearts of Oak SC. Sulley has a contract with Accra Hearts of Oak SC running until 2014–2015 season in Ghana.
Sulley has played for Ghana national football team in 2 matches in the 2013 WAFU Nations Cup in Ghana 2013. Currently, Sulley has played 6 matches for Ghana national football team in the 2014 African Nations Championship in South Africa leading the lines for the Ghana national football team and well disciplined to the semi-finals against Nigeria national football team on Wednesday 29 January 2014, and in the finals against Libya national football team on Saturday 1 February 2014.

In April 2020, Sulley returned to his homeland and joined Hearts of Oak. In September 2021, Iraqi club Erbil SC announced the signing of Sulley. Despite announcing the signing of Sulley, Hearts claimed Sulley was still their player and hadn't transferred him to any club whatsoever. Sulley, however, stayed ad Hearts until 22 December 2021, where his contract with the Ghanese club was terminated.

In January 2022, Sulley returned to Iraq, when he signed with Duhok SC.

International career
In November 2013, coach Maxwell Konadu invited Sulley to be included in the Ghana 30-man team for the 2013 WAFU Nations Cup. Sulley helped Ghana to defeat Senegal to a first-place finish, 3-1.

During the 2013 WAFU Nations Cup, Sulley was invited and has played 8 matches under Maxwell Konadu, the Ghana national team coach: Ghana vs Burkina Faso national football team Semi-Finals WAFU Nations Cup and Ghana vs Senegal national football team Finals WAFU Nations Cup; African Nations Championship tournament in South Africa, Ghana vs Congo national football team, Ghana vs Libya national football team, Ghana vs Ethiopia national football team, Ghana vs DR Congo national football team Quarter-Finals, Ghana vs Nigeria national football team Semi-Finals, and Ghana vs Libya national football team Finals.

Honours
Hearts of Oak

 Ghana Premier League: 2020–21
Ghanaian FA Cup: 2021

National Team 

 WAFU Nations Cup Winner: 2013
 African Nations Championship Runner-up: 2014

References

External links

1992 births
Living people
Ghanaian footballers
Ghana international footballers
Association football defenders
Association football midfielders
Association football utility players
Ghana Premier League players
Accra Hearts of Oak S.C. players
Accra Great Olympics F.C. players
Al-Nasr SC (Benghazi) players
Tala'ea El Gaish SC players
Al-Ittihad Club (Tripoli) players
Al-Mina'a SC players
Naft Al-Basra SC players
Duhok SC players
Alanyaspor footballers
Süper Lig players
TFF First League players
WAFU Nations Cup players
2014 African Nations Championship players
Ghanaian expatriate sportspeople in Iraq
Ghanaian expatriate sportspeople in Libya
Ghanaian expatriate sportspeople in Egypt
Ghanaian expatriate sportspeople in Turkey
Expatriate footballers in Iraq
Expatriate footballers in Libya
Expatriate footballers in Egypt
Expatriate footballers in Turkey
Libyan Premier League players
Ghana A' international footballers